Montage of Heck: The Home Recordings is a compilation of home recordings by Kurt Cobain that were used as the soundtrack to the film Kurt Cobain: Montage of Heck, released posthumously on November 13, 2015 by Universal Music. The album was released as a standard 13-track CD, a 31-track deluxe album, and an audio cassette. The 13-track standard version focuses on the music found on Cobain's personal cassettes and the 31-track deluxe version showcases tracks from the documentary including spoken word, demos and full songs.

The song "Burn the Rain" was sampled in the song Cudi Montage, the final track from American hip-hop duo Kids See Ghosts only studio album in 2018.

Critical reception

Montage of Heck: The Home Recordings was met with mostly mixed reviews. At Metacritic, which assigns a normalized rating out of 100 to reviews from critics, the album received an average score of 56, which indicates "mixed or average reviews", based on 18 reviews. AllMusic senior critic Stephen Thomas Erlewine panned the album, stating: "While that's interesting for a while, at a certain point -- and it arrives rather quickly -- the fascination curdles and it's hard not to feel unclean, as if you're snooping through your beloved brother's desk." Alexis Petridis from The Guardian criticized the release, saying "In 21 years, the posthumous Nirvana industry has gone from releasing the band’s astonishing MTV Unplugged in New York performance to literally putting out recordings of Kurt Cobain making farting noises." Further, Jayson Green of Pitchfork pointed out that "The Home Recordings marks the point where that exploitation enters the absurd."

Nevertheless, Kyle Anderson of Entertainment Weekly praised the album, considering it as "a cultural artifact that provides an inside look at the creative process of an enigmatic genius." Tiny Mix Tapes critic Joe Hemmerling wrote: "There is pleasure to be found here, particularly in Cobain’s left-field excursions into Burroughs-ian collage, but these pleasures will hold scant value to anyone not already convinced of the author’s peculiar genius."

Track listings
All songs written by Kurt Cobain except where noted.

Standard edition
 "The Yodel Song" – 3:37
 "Been a Son" (demo) – 1:21
 "The Happy Guitar" – 2:12
 "Clean Up Before She Comes" (demo) – 2:35
 "Reverb Experiment" – 2:52
 "You Can't Change Me / Burn My Britches / Something in the Way" (demo) – 4:19
 "Scoff" (demo) – 0:37
 "Desire" – 2:27
 "And I Love Her" – 2:05 (Lennon–McCartney)
 "Sappy" (demo) – 2:30
 "Letters to Frances" – 2:05
 "Frances Farmer Will Have Her Revenge on Seattle" (demo) – 4:24
 "She Only Lies" – 2:47

Deluxe edition
 "The Yodel Song" – 3:37
 "Been a Son" (demo) – 1:21
 "What More Can I Say" – 3:09
 "1988 Capitol Lake Jam Commercial" – 1:27
 "The Happy Guitar" – 2:12
 "Montage of Kurt" – 2:12
 "Beans" – 1:22
 "Burn the Rain" – 1:17
 "Clean Up Before She Comes" (demo) – 2:35
 "Reverb Experiment" – 2:52
 "Montage of Kurt II" – 1:09
 "Rehash" – 2:35
 "You Can't Change Me / Burn My Britches / Something in the Way" (demo) – 4:19
 "Scoff" (demo) – 0:37
 "Aberdeen" – 4:19
 "Bright Smile" – 1:56
 "Underground Celebritism" – 0:29
 "Retreat" – 2:13
 "Desire" – 2:27
 "And I Love Her" – 2:05 (Lennon–McCartney)
 "Sea Monkeys" – 0:55
 "Sappy" (demo) – 2:30
 "Letters to Frances" – 2:05
 "Scream" – 0:32
 "Frances Farmer Will Have Her Revenge on Seattle" (demo) – 4:24
 "Kurt Ambiance" – 0:26
 "She Only Lies" – 2:47
 "Kurt Audio Collage" – 0:25
 "Poison's Gone" – 2:12
 "Rhesus Monkey" – 0:44
 "Do Re Mi (Medley)" – 10:11

Super Deluxe Edition Box Set 
A Super Deluxe Edition Box Set was also released containing the Kurt Cobain: Montage of Heck documentary film on both DVD and Blu-ray along with the Montage of Heck: The Home Recordings on CD and on audio cassette (31-track deluxe album versions). It also contained the 160 page version companion hard bound book with more interviews and photos, a 12"x12" double-sided puzzle in its own tin, an 18"x24" double-sided movie poster, collectable 5"x7" double-sided postcards, and a bookmark.

Charts

References

External links
 

2015 soundtrack albums
Kurt Cobain
Soundtracks published posthumously
Universal Music Group soundtracks